The 1988 CONCACAF Pre-Olympic Tournament was the seventh edition of the CONCACAF Pre-Olympic Tournament, the quadrennial, international football tournament organised by the CONCACAF to determine which national teams from the North, Central America and Caribbean region qualify for the Olympic football tournament.

United States and Guatemala qualified for the 1988 Summer Olympics: Mexico had originally qualified, but were disqualified after receiving a two-year suspension by FIFA arising from the Cachirules scandal.

Qualification

Qualified teams
The following teams qualified for the final tournament.

1 Only final tournament.

Final round

Group A

Note: The match between Trinidad and Tobago and El Salvador scheduled for 29 May 1988 was scratched by mutual agreement between the two countries.

Group B

Notes
The match between Mexico and Guyana, scheduled for 9 December 1987, was abandoned after fifteen members of the Guyanese squad defected and asked for political asylum while on a training camp in California, leaving them unable to field a team for the match. Mexico were awarded a 2–0 victory by CONCACAF.
As Mexico were disqualified after their federation received a two-year suspension by FIFA, Guatemala took their place in the final tournament.

Mexico's disqualification

References

Con
CONCACAF Men's Olympic Qualifying Tournament
Qual
Oly
Olympics
Olympics
1996
Football qualification for the 1988 Summer Olympics